The Varying Permeability Model, Variable Permeability Model or VPM is an algorithm that is used to calculate the decompression stops needed for ambient pressure dive profiles using specified breathing gases. It was developed by D.E. Yount and others for use in professional diving and recreational diving. It was developed to model laboratory observations of bubble formation and growth in both inanimate and in vivo systems exposed to pressure. In 1986, this model was applied by researchers at the University of Hawaii to calculate diving decompression tables.

Theoretical basis

The VPM presumes that microscopic bubble nuclei always exist in water and tissues that contain water. Any nuclei larger than a specific "critical" size, which is related to the maximum dive depth (exposure pressure), will grow upon decompression when the diver ascends. The VPM aims to minimize the total volume of these growing bubbles by keeping the external pressure large, and the inspired inert gas partial pressures low during decompression. The model depends on the assumptions that different sizes of bubbles exist within the body; that the larger bubbles require less reduction in pressure to begin to grow than smaller ones; and that fewer large bubbles exist than smaller ones. These are used to construct an algorithm that provides decompression schedules designed to allow the larger, growing bubbles to be eliminated before they can cause problems.

Bibliography 
This bibliography list was compiled by E.B. Maiken and E.C. Baker as reference material for the V-Planner web site in 2002.

Primary Modeling Sources 
 </ref>

VPM Research and Development Sources 
 
 Kunkle, T.D. 1979. Bubble nucleation in supersaturated fluids. Univ. of Hawaii Sea Grant Technical Report UNIHI-SEAGRANT-TR-80-01. Pp. 108.
 
 
 
 
 
 
 
 
 
 Yount, D.E. 1979. Multiple inert-gas bubble disease: a review of the theory. In: Lambertsen, C.J. and Bornmann, R.C. eds. . Undersea Medical Society, Bethesda, 90-125.

VPM Dive Planning Software 
 V-Planner: VPM-B & VPM-B/E, VPM-B/FBO.
 MultiDeco: VPM-B & VPM-B/E, VPM-B/FBO, ZHL-B, ZHL-C, GF, and GFS.
 Ultimate Planner: VPM-B, VPM-B/U, VPM-B (Dec-12), VPM-B/U (Dec-12), ZHL-B, ZHL-C, ZHL-D, GF and GF/U.
 DecoPlanner: VPM-B.
 HLPlanner: VPM-B.
 JDeco: VPM-B.
 PalmVPM: VPM.
 DivePlan: VPM.
 Baltic Deco Planner: VPM-B.
 Subsurface: VPM-B.

VPM Dive computers 
 V-Planner Live: VPM-B & VPM-B/E.
 MultiDeco-X1: VPM-B & VPM-B/E, VPM-B/FBO, ZHL-C, GF, and GFS.
 MultiDeco-DR5: VPM-B & VPM-B/E, VPM-B/FBO, ZHL-C, GF, and GFS.
 Shearwater Research Predator, Petrel, Perdix and NERD models: GF, VPM-B plus GFS.
 RATIO Computers: iX3M series and iDive (Tech and Reb) series VPM-B and ZHL16-B.
 TDC-3 with MultiDeco-TDC: VPM-B & VPM-B/E, VPM-B/FBO, ZHL-C, GF, and GFS.
 HeinrichsWeikamp OSTC4: VPM-B

See also

References

External links
 VPM web site
 VPM development time line

Decompression algorithms